Perfect Dark is an upcoming video game that is in development by The Initiative and Crystal Dynamics. It will be published by Xbox Game Studios for Microsoft Windows and Xbox Series X/S. The game will be a reboot of the Perfect Dark series.

Premise
Perfect Dark will take place in a near future world that has been torn apart by ecological disasters.

Development
Perfect Dark is the first project by The Initiative, a Microsoft studio founded in 2018 and headed by Darrell Gallagher. Gallagher, who had previously worked on the 2013 Tomb Raider revival, chose to work on a Perfect Dark reboot after Microsoft presented him with a few opportunities. Plans for the game had already been discussed before Gallagher joined The Initiative, with Xbox head Phil Spencer stating that the game is seen as an opportunity for protagonist Joanna Dark to diversify the Xbox family. According to a source, the game will run on Unreal Engine 4 and feature "various weapons, gadgets, and a camera surveillance system". Design director Drew Murray revealed that the game is being envisioned as a spy shooter, and that the studio wants the player character's physicality to play a bigger role than in traditional first-person shooters. In February 2021, Murray left The Initiative to rejoin Insomniac Games. Shortly afterwards, God of War producer Rhonda Cox joined the company as senior producer for the game.

In September 2021, The Initiative announced they would be partnering with Crystal Dynamics on the game's development. Daniel Neuburger, who had previously directed several Tomb Raider games at Crystal Dynamics, was the game director, until he left The Initiative in February 2022. In the previous 12 months, a substantial number of developers had also left the company, citing a lack of creative autonomy and slow development progress as the reason for their departures. In May 2022, after Embracer Group announced that they had entered an agreement with Square Enix to acquire Crystal Dynamics, The Initiative confirmed that they would still continue to co-develop the game with the studio. In November 2022, Xbox Studios boss Matt Booty revealed that, after the departure of several senior staff members at The Initiative, the Perfect Dark team has been slowly rebuilding while dealing with the challenges of the COVID-19 pandemic and starting up a new studio.

Marketing and release
Although work on a Perfect Dark revival was rumored in early 2018, Perfect Dark was officially announced at The Game Awards 2020 with a teaser trailer, after development on the game had been hinted by some sources earlier that year. As a first-party Microsoft game, Perfect Dark is expected to be released for Xbox platforms and Microsoft Windows. The game will also be available for Xbox Game Pass subscribers.

References

External links

 

Upcoming video games
Crystal Dynamics games
First-person shooters
Microsoft games
Perfect Dark games
Video game reboots
Video games developed in the United States
Unreal Engine games